G3: Live in Concert is a live album and DVD by the G3 project, led by Joe Satriani. It was released in 1997 by Epic Records. This lineup of G3 includes Joe Satriani, Eric Johnson and Steve Vai. In 2005, a DVD of this concert was also released.

Track listing

CD track listing

Joe Satriani
All songs written by Joe Satriani.
"Cool №9" – 6:47
"Flying in a Blue Dream" – 5:59
"Summer Song" – 6:28

Eric Johnson
All songs written by Eric Johnson, except where noted.
"Zap" – 6:07
 "Manhattan" – 5:16
 "Camel's Night Out" (Kyle Brock, Mark Younger-Smith) – 5:57

Steve Vai
All songs written by Steve Vai.
"Answers" – 6:58
 "For the Love of God" – 7:47
 "The Attitude Song" – 5:14

Joe Satriani, Eric Johnson, Steve Vai
"Going Down" (Don Nix) – 5:47
Freddie King cover (Originally released by blues legend Freddie King in 1970)
 "My Guitar Wants to Kill Your Mama" (Frank Zappa) – 5:21
Frank Zappa cover
 "Red House" (Jimi Hendrix) – 9:12
The Jimi Hendrix Experience cover

DVD track listing

Joe Satriani
"Cool #9"
"Flying in a Blue Dream"
"Summer Song"

Eric Johnson
"12 to 12 Vibe"
 "Manhattan"
 "S.R.V."

Steve Vai
"Answers"
 "Segueway Jam Piece"
 "For the Love of God"
 "The Attitude Song"

The G3 Jam
"Going Down"
 "My Guitar Wants to Kill Your Mama"
 "Red House"

Personnel

Joe Satriani
 Joe Satriani – guitar, vocals
 Stuart Hamm – bass
 Jeff Campitelli – drums

Steve Vai
 Steve Vai – lead guitar
 Mike Keneally – rhythm guitar, sitar, keyboards, vocals
 Philip Bynoe – bass and percussion
 Mike Mangini – drums and percussion

Eric Johnson
 Eric Johnson – guitar, vocals
 Stephen Barber – keyboards
 Roscoe Beck – bass
 Brannen Temple – drums

G3
 Joe Satriani – guitar, vocals (on Going Down)
 Steve Vai – guitar, vocals (on My guitar want to kill your Ma)
 Eric Johnson – guitar, vocals (on Red House)
 Stuart Hamm – bass
 Jeff Campitelli – drums
 Guest: Mike Keneally - vocals (on My guitar want to kill your Ma)

References

G3 (tour) albums
Albums produced by Mike Fraser
2005 video albums
Live video albums
Joe Satriani live albums
1997 live albums
Epic Records live albums
Epic Records video albums